Curtis Browning (born 30 October 1993) is an Australian professional rugby union footballer. His usual position is loose forward.

Early life
Browning was born in Brisbane, Australia. His grandfather, Dick Marks, was a 1960s Wallaby centre and National Director of Coaching. He attended Brisbane State High School where he was school captain and was selected for the Australian Schoolboys rugby team for three years in a row from 2009 to 2011.

Rugby career
Browning played for University of Queensland in their Queensland Premier Rugby Hospital Cup victory in 2012. He was selected for the Australian U-20 team to play in the IRB Junior World Championships in 2012 and 2013, captaining the team in 2013.

At the annual John Eales Medal awards, he was named the Australian Under-20s Player of the Year for two years in a row in 2012 and 2013.
In 2013, Browning joined the Queensland Reds College Squad and made his Super Rugby debut from the bench against the Bulls in March of that year. He signed a two-year main squad contract with the Reds in May 2013.

Super Rugby statistics

Reference list

1993 births
Australian rugby union players
Queensland Reds players
Brisbane City (rugby union) players
Rugby union flankers
Sportsmen from Queensland
Living people
People educated at Brisbane State High School
Rugby union players from Brisbane
Lyon OU players
Australian expatriate rugby union players
Australian expatriate sportspeople in France
Expatriate rugby union players in France